General Sir Henry Charles Loyd,  (12 February 1891 – 11 November 1973), nicknamed "Budget Loyd", was a senior British Army officer who fought in both the world wars, most notably during the Second World War as General Officer Commanding (GOC) of the 2nd Infantry Division during the Battle of France in May 1940.

Early life and First World War
Born on 12 February 1891 in Belgravia, Westminster, London, the son of Edward Henry Loyd, Charles Loyd was educated at Eton and the Royal Military College, Sandhurst and was commissioned as a second lieutenant into the Coldstream Guards on 3 September 1910. Another future general, Arthur Smith, was among his fellow graduates.

He served on the Western Front during the First World War with the 2nd Battalion, Coldstream Guards, then part of the 4th (Guards) Brigade of the 2nd Division, and was wounded in action four times, thrice mentioned in despatches, including on 1 January 1918, awarded the Distinguished Service Order (DSO), the Military Cross in 1915 and the French Croix de guerre. He was also, by war's end, a brevet lieutenant colonel and, as Commanding Officer (CO) of the 2nd Battalion, Coldstream Guards, one of the youngest battalion commanders in the British Army. The citation for his MC reads:

Between the wars
After the war Loyd was selected for the first postwar course at the Staff College, Camberley from 1919 to 1920. In 1922 he married Lady Moya Brodrick, the youngest daughter of the St John Brodrick, 1st Earl of Midleton; they had two children, a daughter, Lavinia Gertrude Georgiana, born on 21 December 1923, and a son, Julian St. John, born on 25 May 1926. In 1925 he returned to the Staff College, this time as an instructor, until 1926 when he was appointed CO of the 3rd Battalion, Coldstream Guards.

He was promoted to regimental commander, commanding the Coldstream Guards regimental district, in 1932. In 1934, he became a staff officer at the War Office, moving on to be a brigadier on the General Staff of British Troops in Egypt in 1936. In 1938, he was appointed commander of the 1st (Guards) Brigade, then part of the 1st Infantry Division. In June 1939 he was appointed General Officer Commanding (GOC) of the 2nd Infantry Division, three months before the outbreak of the Second World War.

Second World War
His division, comprising the 4th, 5th and 6th Infantry Brigades and supporting units, was sent to France soon after war began, where it formed part of Lieutenant General Sir John Dill's I Corps of the British Expeditionary Force (BEF). The division fought in the Battle of France and the subsequent retreat to Dunkirk where it was withdrawn to England in the Dunkirk evacuation. However, on 16 May 1940, Loyd fainted during a conference and was evacuated to England, with command of the 2nd Division passing to Brigadier Noel Irwin, commander of the 6th Brigade.

In 1941, after serving as Director of Infantry at the War Office in succession to Major General Henry Willcox, he became Chief of Staff to General Sir Alan Brooke, the Commander-in-Chief, Home Forces, who had been a fellow student at the Staff College shortly after the First World War and thought highly of "Budget" Loyd, before moving on to be General Officer Commanding (GOC) Southern Command in March 1942. Knighted the following year, his last appointment was as Major-General commanding the Brigade of Guards and GOC London District in March 1944, a post which he held until he retired from the army, after the war, in 1947, after receiving a promotion to full general in 1946. He was appointed a Knight Commander of the Royal Victorian Order (KCVO) on 30 January 1947.

Postwar

In retirement he was a Deputy Lieutenant of Norfolk. He lived at Geldeston Hall in Norfolk. He was a Justice of the Peace for the county in 1954, and from 1945 to 1966 he served as Colonel of the Coldstream Guards, after having his knighthood enhanced in 1965.

References

Bibliography

External links
British Army Officers 1939−1945
Generals of World War II

|-
 

|-
 

|-

1891 births
1973 deaths
British Army generals
Burials in Surrey
Graduates of the Royal College of Defence Studies
British Army cricketers
British Army generals of World War II
British Army personnel of World War I
Coldstream Guards officers
Companions of the Distinguished Service Order
Deputy Lieutenants of Norfolk
English cricketers
Graduates of the Royal Military College, Sandhurst
Graduates of the Staff College, Camberley
Knights Commander of the Order of the Bath
Knights Grand Cross of the Royal Victorian Order
People educated at Eton College
People from Belgravia
Recipients of the Military Cross
War Office personnel in World War II
Military personnel from London
Academics of the Staff College, Camberley